The 2016–17 Western Football League season (known as the 2016–17 Toolstation Western Football League for sponsorship reasons) was the 115th in the history of the Western Football League, a football competition in England. Teams were divided into two divisions; the Premier and the First.

Premier Division
The Premier Division was reduced from 21 clubs to 20, and featured two new clubs after Barnstaple Town were promoted to Southern League Division One South & West, Winterbourne United resigned from the league, and Welton Rovers were relegated to the First Division.

Chipping Sodbury Town, champions of the First Division.
Wells City, runners-up in the First Division.

Bristol Manor Farm, Buckland Athletic, Clevedon Town, Melksham Town and Street applied for promotion to Step 4 for 2017–18.

With the news that Gillingham Town were resigning from the Western League for financial reasons at the end of the season, and the fact that the Premier Division is already two clubs short, only one club was relegated.

League table

First Division
The First Division was increased from 21 clubs to 22, and featured three new clubs after the promotion of Chipping Sodbury and Wells City to the Premier Division:
Bishops Lydeard, promoted from the Somerset County League.
Malmesbury Victoria, promoted from the Wiltshire League.
Welton Rovers, relegated from the Premier Division.

League table

References
 League tables

External links
 Western League Official Site

2016-17
9